The Treaties of Tilsit were two agreements signed by French Emperor Napoleon in the town of Tilsit in July 1807 in the aftermath of his victory at Friedland. The first was signed on 7 July, between Napoleon and Russian Emperor Alexander, when they met on a raft in the middle of the Neman River. The second was signed with Prussia on 9 July. The treaties were made at the expense of the Prussian king, who had already agreed to a truce on 25 June after the Grande Armée had captured Berlin and pursued him to the easternmost frontier of his realm. In Tilsit, he ceded about half of his pre-war territories.  

From those territories, Napoleon had created French sister republics, which were formalized and recognized at Tilsit: the Kingdom of Westphalia, the Duchy of Warsaw and the Free City of Danzig; the other ceded territories were awarded to existing French client states and to Russia.

Napoleon not only cemented his control of Central Europe but also had Russia and the truncated Prussia ally with him against his two remaining enemies, the United Kingdom and Sweden, triggering the Anglo-Russian and Finnish wars. Tilsit also freed French forces for the Peninsular War. Central Europe became a battlefield again in 1809 when Austria and the UK engaged France in the War of the Fifth Coalition.

Franco-Russian treaty (7 July)

The treaty ended the war between Imperial Russia and the French Empire and began an alliance between the two empires that rendered the rest of continental Europe almost powerless. The two countries secretly agreed to aid each other in disputes. France pledged to aid Russia against the Ottoman Empire while Russia agreed to join the Continental System against the British Empire. Napoleon also convinced Alexander to enter into the Anglo-Russian War and to instigate the Finnish War against Sweden to force Sweden to join the Continental System. More specifically, the Tsar agreed to evacuate Wallachia and Moldavia, which had been occupied by Russian forces as part of the Russo-Turkish War, 1806-1812. The Ionian Islands and Cattaro (Kotor), which had been captured by Russian admirals Ushakov and Senyavin, were to be handed over to the French. In recompense, Napoleon guaranteed the sovereignty of the Duchy of Oldenburg and several other small states ruled by the Tsar's German relatives.

Franco-Prussian treaty (9 July)

The treaty with Prussia stripped the country of about half its territory: Cottbus passed to Saxony, the left bank of the Elbe was awarded to the newly created Kingdom of Westphalia, Białystok was given to Russia (which led to the creation of the Belostok Oblast), and most of the Polish lands in Prussian possession since the Second and Third Partitions became the quasi-independent Duchy of Warsaw. Prussia was to reduce the army to 43,000 and on 9 March 1808, France fixed its tribute to be levied from Prussia at 154,500,000 francs (= Prussian dollar 41.73 mio.), deducting 53,500,000, which had been raised so far during the ongoing French occupation. The sum was lowered in two steps to 120 million francs by 1 November 1808.

Talleyrand had advised Napoleon to pursue milder terms; the treaties marked an important stage in his estrangement from the emperor. Until 1812, the French occupants requisitioned in money and kind from various corporations and persons, especially by billetting soldiers on cities, further contributions additionally amounting to between 146 and 309 million francs, according to different calculations. The Prussian government indebtedness soared between 1806 and 1815 by thaler 200 million to altogether 180.09 million interest-bearing debts, 11.24 million non-interest-bearing unconsolidated treasury notes and another 25.9 million former provincial debts assumed by the royal government. The cities' debts, especially those of Berlin often billetted on, were not assumed by the Prussian government. Since the creditors deemed Prussia to be over-indebted in 1817, the 4-per cent state bonds were traded at the bourses with a disagio of 27 to 29 percent, in 1818 even with a discountor of 35 percent, causing the effective interest to rise to 6.15 percent. At restructuring part of the debts in 1818 by a £5 million loan (= thaler 30 million) at 5% at the London financial market, the Prussian government had to accept a disagio of 28⅓%, thus paying an annual effective rate of 6.98%.

When the Treaty was being formulated, it was noted by an observer that the Prussian king was pacing on the bank of the Neman river; Napoleon had to "but raise his hand, and Prussia would cease to exist" (McKay). Hence, many observers in Prussia and Russia viewed the treaty as unequal and as a national humiliation. The Russian soldiers refused to follow Napoleon's commands, as the Lisbon Incident demonstrated to all Europe. Napoleon's plans to marry the tsar's sister were stymied by Russian royalty. Cooperation between Russia and France eventually broke down in 1810 when the tsar began to allow neutral ships to land in Russian ports. In 1812, Napoleon crossed the Neman river and invaded Russia, ending any vestige of alliance.

Territorial and population losses suffered by Prussia

The Prussian state was diminished by more than half under the terms of the treaty of Tilsit, from 5,700 Prussian square miles to 2,800. Compared to the 9.75 million inhabitants the country had prior to the treaty, no more than 4.5 million remained within the new boundaries of Prussia. The state revenue, which formerly amounted to forty million dollars per annum, was decreased in a still greater proportion; the ceded provinces were quite rich and fertile, and many millions had been expended on their improvement. Almost all that Prussia had gained by the partitions of Poland (1772–1795) was taken from it. Saxony, a former confederate of Prussia, was the recipient of the provinces; and Russia, the more powerful of its erstwhile allies, gained territory with a population of 200,000. The following is a tabulation of the territorial and population losses that Prussia suffered (without the Prussian acquisitions since 1772) under the terms of Tilsit treaty:

Aftermath
The War of the Fourth Coalition was over. The Peninsular War began on 19 November 1807 and the War of the Fifth Coalition began in 1809.

The Neman was crossed at the outset of the 1812 French invasion of Russia.

Following the end of the Napoleonic Wars in 1815, the Congress of Vienna would restore many Prussian territories.

By signing these treaties, France left Persia and the Ottomans, who had previously hoped for France's help under treaties with France (including Finckenstein), in the face of Russian aggression, and established the loss of parts of Persia in the Caucasus, such as the present-day republics Azerbaijan, Georgia and Armenia.

Notes

References

External links

Tilsit
Tilsit
Tilsit
Duchy of Warsaw
1807 in France
1807 in Germany
Tilsit
Tilsit
Tilsit
Tilsit
Tilsit
1807 in the Russian Empire
1807 in Prussia
July 1807 events
French rule in the Ionian Islands (1807–1814)